The 1990 Liège–Bastogne–Liège was the 76th edition of the Liège–Bastogne–Liège cycle race and was held on 15 April 1990. The race started and finished in Liège. The race was won by Eric Van Lancker of the Panasonic team.

General classification

References

1990
1990 in Belgian sport
1990 UCI Road World Cup
April 1990 sports events in Europe
1990 in road cycling